Neromyloi is a village and a community of the Agia municipality. The 2011 census recorded 261 inhabitants in the village. The community of Neromyloi covers an area of 4.698 km2.

Population
According to the 2011 census, the population of the settlement of Neromyloi was 261 people, a decrease of almost 26% compared with the population of the previous census of 2001.

See also
 List of settlements in the Larissa regional unit

References

Populated places in Larissa (regional unit)